The Lange Berge ("Long Hills") are a small range of the German Central Uplands, up to , which lie mainly in the Bavarian provinces of Upper Franconia with northwestern foothills in Thuringia.

Location 
The Lange Berge lie on the border between Bavaria and Thuringia in the counties of Coburg and Hildburghausen between Eisfeld on the River Werra to the north, the Lauter valley to the east, Coburg on the Itz to the south and Bad Rodach to the west.

Hills 
The highest point of the Lange Berge is the Buchberg (527.2 m) in Bavaria, a barely noticeable eminence on the A 73 motorway between the Sennigshöhe and the motorway junction of Eisfeld-Süd. The highest hills in the range are (heights in metres (m) above Normalnull (NN)):
 Buchberg (527.2 m), Bavaria
 Mirsdorfer Kuppe (525.3 m), Bavaria
 Sennigshöhe (522.8 m), Bavaria
 Walleskuppe (513.5 m), Thuringian/Bavarian border
 Hohe Wart (504.8 m), Thuringia
 Jägersberg (491.4 m), Bavaria
 Ottenberg (487.4 m), Bavaria
 Hildburghausener Höhe (461.6 m), Bavaria

References 

Central Uplands
Hill ranges of Bavaria
Coburg (district)
Natural regions of Germany
Franconia